Moké Kajima (born June 3, 1974 in Kinshasa, Zaire) is a football player from the Congo. His position is defender, who plays for Calais RUFC.

Career 
Kajima began his career in 2000 at Olympique Noisy-le-Sec before moving after a season to Olympique Alès. He moved from Alès, again after just one season, to Pau FC in 2002. His form at Pau caught the eye of some higher-level clubs as he appeared 36 times at the club, scoring once. He moved to Dijon FCO in 2003, where he played three seasons and moved to Paris FC. He joined after 1 year and 10 games with Paris FC to US Orléans in July 2008.

International 
Kajima played his first international match for the Congo national football team in 2006. Previously, he had been called up to the DR Congo national football team in 2005, but did not appear in a match.

References

External links

Stats on foot-national.com

Living people
1974 births
Republic of the Congo footballers
Republic of the Congo international footballers
Association football defenders
Olympique Alès players
Stade de Reims players
Dijon FCO players
Paris FC players
Calais RUFC players
Olympique Noisy-le-Sec players
Pau FC players